Richard Perkins (born in 1961 in Boulder City, Nevada) is an American politician.  He served as a Democratic member of the Nevada Assembly from 1992 to 2006 representing District 23, covering parts of Henderson).  Perkins served as floor leader from 1995 to 2001 and as Speaker of the Assembly from 2001 to 2006.

Biography
Perkins obtained a BA in criminal justice and political science from University of Nevada, Las Vegas.  He was a police officer with the Henderson Police Department for approximately 25 years, eventually retiring as chief of the department in 2008.

The most significant event during Perkins' tenure in the Legislature was the budget dispute of 2003.  Nevada's tax structure has traditionally been heavily dependent on sales and gaming taxes.  After 9/11, tourism was sharply reduced, which caused a substantial hole in the state budget.  Republican Governor Kenny Guinn proposed a $980 million increase in revenue to fill this hole.  However, while the Legislature was able to pass the Governor's budget with a simple majority, anti-tax Republicans in the Assembly refused to vote for it and so the budget was denied a 2/3 majority.  This provoked a constitutional crisis, since Nevada's Constitution requires a 2/3 majority for revenue-generating bills and also requires that K-12 education be funded.  Guinn called two special sessions of the Legislature, neither of which was able to pass an education budget with the required majority.  Ultimately, the Supreme Court of Nevada was required to rule on the crisis, and held that the education funding requirement took precedence over the 2/3 majority requirement.

During his tenure, Perkins was a primary sponsor on a number of high-profile bills.  These included: Assembly Bill 220 (1999), establishing Nevada State College in Henderson; Assembly Bill 27 (2001), which prohibited the placement of juveniles performing community service along a highway or at another dangerous location; Assembly Bill 250 (2003) and Assembly Bill 441 (2003), which created Nevada's homeland security laws governing acts of terrorism and related emergencies; and Assembly Bill 322 (2003), which created a statewide alert system for the safe return of abducted children.

Perkins considered running in the 2006 Nevada gubernatorial election but ultimately decided not to.  After retiring as a legislator, Perkins opened his own lobbying firm, counting clients such as Newmont Mining and the city of Henderson.

Elections
2004 Perkins was unopposed in the primary, and won the general election with 9,618 votes (58.48%) against Republican nominee Steven Grierson.
2002 Perkins was unopposed in both the primary and the general election.
2000 Perkins was unopposed in the primary, and won the general election with 7,093 votes (62.69%) against Republican nominee Michael Cannon.
1998 Perkins was unopposed in the primary, and won the general election with 5,373 votes (68.28%) against Republican nominee Troy A. La Mana.
1996 Perkins was unopposed in the primary, and won the general election with 5,507 votes (64.81%) against Republican nominee Jim Born.
1994 Perkins was unopposed in both the primary and the general election.
1992 Perkins was unopposed in the primary, and won the general election with 5,508 votes (66.44%) against Republican nominee Allen R. Chastain.

References

External links
Official page at the Nevada Legislature
 

Living people
1961 births
People from the Las Vegas Valley
American police chiefs
Speakers of the Nevada Assembly
Democratic Party members of the Nevada Assembly
21st-century American politicians
20th-century American politicians
People from Boulder City, Nevada
University of Nevada, Las Vegas alumni